WNCO-FM (101.3 MHz) is a radio station broadcasting a country music format.  Licensed to Ashland, Ohio, United States, the station serves the Mid-Ohio area.  The station is currently owned by iHeartMedia, Inc. and features programming from Premiere Networks.

History
Then called WATG-FM, the station began broadcasting May 18, 1947, on 100.7 MHz width. It was owned by Robert M. Beer and Edgar Koehl, publishers of the Ashland Times-Gazette.

References

External links

NCO-FM
Radio stations established in 1996
IHeartMedia radio stations